Eyyal is a village in Thrissur District in the state of Kerala, India.
Archeologists have unearthed a collection of old Roman coins in 1946. These coins date from 123 BC to 117 AD. These coins currently exhibited in the Archeological Museum of Thrissur.

Population, Religion, Caste, Working Data 
Eyyal is a Census Town city situated in Talappilly taluka of Thrissur district. As per the Population Census 2011, there are total 1,579 families residing in the Eyyal city. The total population of Eyyal is 6,727 out of which 3,097 are males and 3,630 are females thus the Average Sex Ratio of Eyyal is 1,172.

The population of Children of age 0-6 years in Eyyal city is 776 which is 12% of the total population. There are 383 male children and 393 female children between the age 0-6 years. Thus as per the Census 2011 the Child Sex Ratio of Eyyal is 1,026 which is less than Average Sex Ratio (1,172).

As per the Census 2011, the literacy rate of Eyyal is 94.2%. Thus Eyyal has lower literacy rate compared to 95.1% of Thrissur district. The male literacy rate is 84.3% and the female literacy rate is 82.6% in Eyyal.

Population 6,727

Literacy 94.2%

Sex Ratio 1,172

Eyyal Census Town has total administration over 1,579 houses to which it supplies basic amenities like water and sewerage. It is also authorize to build roads within Census Town limits and impose taxes on properties coming under its jurisdiction.

Eyyal Census Town 
As per the Population Census 2011 data, following are some quick facts about Eyyal Census Town.

Caste-wise Population - Eyyal 
Schedule Caste (SC) constitutes 13.5% while Schedule Tribe (ST) were 0.1% of total population in Eyyal.

Religion-wise Population - Eyyal

Literacy Rate - Eyyal 
The total literacy rate of Eyyal was 94.25% in 2011 which is greater than average literacy rate 94% of Kerala. Population-wise, out of total 5,609 literates, males were 2,612 while females were 2,997. Also the male literacy rate was 96.24% and the female literacy rate was 92.59% in Eyyal.

Sex Ratio - Eyyal 
The Sex Ratio of Eyyal is 1,172. Thus per every 1000 men there were 1,172 females in Eyyal. Also as per Census , the Child Sex Ration was 1,026 which is less than Average Sex Ratio ( 1,172 ) of Eyyal.

Child Population - Eyyal 
According to Census 2011, there were 776 children between age 0 to 6 years in Eyyal. Out of which 383 were male while 393 were female.

Working Population - Eyyal 
In Eyyal Census Town out of total population, 2,417 were engaged in work activities. 82% of workers describe their work as Main Work (Employment or Earning more than 6 Months) while 18% were involved in Marginal activity providing livelihood for less than 6 months. Of 2,417 workers engaged in Main Work, 142 were cultivators (owner or co-owner) while 119 were Agricultural labourer.

Eyyal Wards 
A ward is a local authority area, typically used for electoral purposes. Eyyal is further divided into 1 ward where elections are held every 5 years.

References

Villages in Thrissur district